Walking to the Waterline is a 1998 American drama film written and directed by Matt Mulhern and starring Matt Mulhern, Alan Ruck, Matthew Broderick, and Hallie Foote. The film premiered at the Florida Film Festival on June 13, 1998. The film aired in heavy rotation on IFC.

Premise
Once a successful television sitcom star, Francis McGowan is now a struggling actor who returns to his family home on the Jersey Shore to sell it following his father's death. While there, he interacts with his agent Michael Woods, his childhood friend Duane Hopwood, and tour guide Lucy Bammer, with whom he drifts into a casual affair while his wife and children wait for him to return home.

Cast
Matt Mulhern as Francis McGowan 
Alan Ruck as Duane Hopwood
Matthew Broderick as Michael Woods 
Hallie Foote as Lucy Bammer
Jon Cypher as Fred Blumquist
Hal Holbrook as Man on the Beach
Beverly Archer as Pam Whitman
Michael Boatman as Marshall

Production
Walking to the Waterline was Matt Mulhern's directorial debut and was filmed during 1997 in Ocean City and Atlantic City, New Jersey. His sophomore effort, the 2005 drama Duane Hopwood, focused on one of the supporting characters he created for this film.

Mulhern starred in the film and was able to enlist Ruck, Broderick, Holbrook, and Boatman to the cast as they were friends of his.

Release 
Walking to the Waterline premiered at the Florida Film Festival on June 13, 1998.

Critical reception 
Josh Ralske of TV Guide reviewed the film, writing "There's a sweet underlying sadness to the film, but it's much too soft around the edges."

References

External links

1998 films
1998 drama films
American independent films
1998 independent films
American drama films
Films about actors
Films shot in New Jersey
Films set in New Jersey
1998 directorial debut films
1990s English-language films
1990s American films